Subah is an Indian television series that aired on DD National in 1987 directed by Bharat Rangachary. It is based on a novel by Sivasankari, titled Avan. The title song for the series, "Aye zamane tere samne aa gaye", was sung by R. D. Burman.

Plot
The story starts with an innocent young man joining college. He is friends with a junkie Salim Ghouse. And then how he falls for drugs.

Cast
 Salim Ghouse as Bharat
 Kumar Bhatia as Prem

References

External links
 

DD National original programming
1980s Indian television series
Television shows about drugs
1987 Indian television series debuts
Television shows based on Indian novels